Mangala Gowri Maduve was an Indian Kannada language television drama series. It aired on Colors Kannada and is directed by K.S. Ramji. It is the sequel of Putta Gowri Maduve, premiered on 24 December 2012. This is the longest-running Kannada television series and one of the longest-running Indian TV serials. The series finale is set to air on 09 October 2022 after eleven years on air.

Putta Gowri Maduve started off as a remake of Colors TV's Hindi drama Balika Vadhu, but later deviated from it entirely.

Originally Putta Gowri Maduve starred Ranjani Raghavan and Rakshith Gowda. In 2018,  Kavya Shree and Gagan Chinappa became the main leads and the series was renamed to Mangala Gowri Maduve on 6 April 2019. In March 2019, Chandrakala Mohan playing Rajeshwari quit the series with the death of her character.

Synopsis 
The series started with the journey of eight-year-old, Putta Gowri, who was forced to marry a boy named Mahesh of the same age. Her life turned upside down as she tries to adjust to traditions and customs of her in-laws. The story then advanced to her adulthood as she raises her voice against orthodox rituals.

Mahesh became a doctor and fell for his fellow doctor Hima. Her father and her father's sister plotted against Putta Gowri. They trick her to get Mahesh and Hima married. But Mahesh later realises that he loves only Gowri. Mahesh finally reunites with Putta Gowri in the end. Hima's father then repents for ruining his daughter's life.

The renamed series title concentrates on the lives of Mangala Gowri and Rajeev. Mangala Gowri is the niece of Mahesh and the great-granddaughter of Rajeshwari aka Ajjamma. She is rebellious, but unexpectedly marries IPS officer Rajeev.

Cast

Putta Gowri Maduve

Main
 Rakshith Gowda as Mahesh Chandra/Mahi
 Ranjani Raghavan as Gowri Mahesh/Putta Gowri: Mahesh's wife

Recurring
 Namratha Gowda as Hima: Mahesh's ex-girlfriend and ex-wife; Gowri's friend
 Sameer Puranik as young Mahesh
 Sanya Iyer as young Putta Gowri
 Ankita Amar as young Suguna: elder sister of Mahesh
 Shishir Shastry as young Shyam: Suguna's husband
 Sindhu Kalyan as Sagari: Hima's aunt
 Chandrakala Mohan as Rayadurga Rajeshwari/Ajjamma: Mahesh's grandmother
 Suneel Puranik
 Ruthu as Kamali: Mahesh's aunt
 Gopal Krishna as Jagadish: Gowri's father 
 Kavya Shree as Mangala Gowri: Mahesh's niece, daughter of Shyam and Suguna, introduced before renaming
 Harini Chandra as Bhagya: Gowri's mother
 Suchetan Rangaswamy
 Koli Ramya as Kamli

Mangala Gowri Maduve

Main
 Kavyashree as Mangala Gowri: Shyam and Suguna's daughter
 Pruthvi Nandan as Rajeev: SP (police officer), Anu's son (2019–2022)
 Gangan Chinnappa as Rajeev: SP Police Officer
 Yashaswini as Sneha: Rajiv's fiancée and, later, Rajiv's wife
 Aishwarya Sindhogi as Tanisha: Soundarya'sister
 Tanisha Kuppandha as Soundarya: Rajiv's enemy and Rajiv's brother's wife
 Radhika Minchu as Soundarya
 Shubha Raksha as Sheethal 
 Hanumanthe Gowda as Shivaprasad, Public Prosecutor

Recurring
 Sushmitha as Neeli: Balli's sister
 Veena Venkateshas: Head of the Rajeev family (Vasu)
 Manasa Joshi as Rayadurga Rajeshwari
 Shourya as Surya: Sneha's brother

Reception 
Putta Gowri Maduve received criticism for to its elongated plots and tracks like lead character Putta Gowri surviving a tiger attack, snake bite in forests and she shown pregnant for more than a year. Despite, it was one among the most watched Kannada drama.

It was the sixth most watched Kannada television during 2013. As in week 23 of 2019, it was at fourth position with 3.84 million impressions. Even in 2020, the serial with the new name and plot held its position among top 5 most watched Kannada shows in BARC ratings.

References

External links 
 
Mangala Gowri Maduve at Voot
Colors Kannada - Mangala Gowri Maduve Show

2012 Indian television series debuts
2022 Indian television series endings
Kannada-language television shows
Colors Kannada original programming